Lorraine Miller (January 5, 1922 – February 6, 1978) was an American actress. She is best known for appearing in the film The White Gorilla (1945). 

Miller was the daughter of Charles W. Miller, an electrical engineer. She attended Michigan State College before she became an actress. When she arrived in California she stayed at the "Studio Club", a residence for young actresses. Her roommate there was Donna Reed. 

In 1944, a photograph of Miller that was printed on postcards resulted in a lawsuit. She sued Photo Specialty Company, Samuel Goldwyn, and others for $50,000, saying that the widely distributed postcards harmed her career, reduced her earning power, and embarrassed her. Taken when Miller worked for Goldwyn, the photograph showed Miller in black lingerie on a white fur rug and had the caption "Samuel Goldwyn's Most Cuddlesome Blonde". The lawsuit said that Miller had not given her consent for use of the image. In 1945 she was a dancer at Billy Rose's Diamond Horseshoe.

On Broadway, Miller appeared in Happy Birthday (1946) and Magdalena (1948).

She married American film actor and director Edward Buzzell on December 10, 1949, in Palm Springs, California.

Filmography

Film

Television

References

External links 

Rotten Tomatoes profile

1922 births
1978 deaths
People from  Michigan
Actresses from Michigan
American film actresses
20th-century American actresses
American stage actresses
Broadway theatre people